Otu or OTU may refer to:
 Otu:
 Otu, Iran, a village in Mazandaran Province, Iran
 Otu, Siga, Japan
 Otú Airport, an airport in the village of Otú and serving the town of Remedios, Colombia
 OTU:
 Ontario Tech University, a postsecondary institution in Ontario, Canada
 Operational taxonomic unit, in biology
 Operational Training Unit (Royal Air Force)
 Optical channel Transport Unit, a layer of the Optical Transport Network
 Oxygen toxicity unit, a measure of exposure to a toxic concentration of oxygen in breathing gas.

People with the name
Michael Otu (1925–2006), senior commander in the Ghana Air Force

See also
Otu Jeremi, a town in Ughelli South LGA of Delta State, Nigeria 
Otu barrage, a masonry weir on the Ghaggar-Hakra river in Haryana state of India